Woodstock is a city in Cherokee County, Georgia, United States. The population was 33,039 as of 2019 according to the US Census Bureau. Originally a stop on the Louisville and Nashville Railroad, Woodstock is part of the Atlanta metropolitan area. The city was the tenth fastest-growing suburb in the United States in 2007.

History
The Georgia General Assembly incorporated Woodstock as a town in 1897. The community derives its name from Woodstock, an 1826 novel by Walter Scott.

The Woodstock Depot was built in 1912 by the Louisville & Nashville Railroad as the town grew. The line transported cotton, rope, and other agricultural products, as well as passengers. Passenger service ended in 1949.

Geography

Demographics

2020 census

As of the 2020 United States census, there were 35,065 people, 12,878 households, and 8,464 families residing in the city.

2010 census
As of the census of 2010, there were 23,896 people, 9,580 households, and 6,137 families residing in the city. The racial makeup of the city was 79.3% White, 10.2% African American, 0.2% American Indian, 4.5% Asian, 0.02% Pacific Islander, 2.7% from other races, and 3.1% from two or more races. Hispanic or Latino of any race were 9.7% of the population.

There were 9,580 households, out of which 35.2% had children under the age of 18 living with them, 48.8% were married couples living together, 11.7% had a female householder with no husband present, and 35.9% were non-families. 29.3% of all households were made up of individuals, and 7.5% had someone living alone who was 65 years of age or older. The average household size was 2.48 and the average family size was 3.12.

In the city, the age distribution of the population shows 26.5% under the age of 18, 6.8% from 18 to 24, 37.4% from 25 to 44, 20.8% from 45 to 64, and 8.5% who were 65 years of age or older. The median age was 34 years. For every 100 females, there were 88.4 males. For every 100 females age 18 and over, there were 84.1 males.

In 2000, the median income for a household in the city was $58,506, and the median income for a family was $65,740. Males had a median income of $48,054 versus $32,798 for females. The per capita income for the city was $25,586. About 2.2% of families and 4.2% of the population were below the poverty line, including 5.0% of those under age 18 and 8.6% of those age 65 or over.

Arts and culture

Memorials
On May 25, 2009, the city of Woodstock unveiled the new Woodstock Memorial, 10 tons of polished granite dedicated to Woodstock veterans. It reads: "To the men and women of Woodstock, Georgia who served in the armed forces of our country preserving our freedom and our way of life Erected in their honor - May 2009".

A one-lane bridge over Kellogg Creek along Kemp Drive was named after 15-year-old Katie Hamlin, who was murdered in 2002.

Parks and recreation

The Greenprints Project
The Greenprints Project calls for the construction of trails along the city's natural areas like the Little River, Noonday Creek, and the U.S. Army Corps of Engineers' property, and in the city's core areas. Bike lanes, which within the project are considered trails, would be built along roads throughout the city.

The proposed trails would connect with existing trails elsewhere in Cherokee County as well as in the cities of Roswell and Alpharetta and Cobb County. The project also would preserve greenspace throughout the city and create new parks.

Greenprints Alliance, Inc. is a grassroots citizen action group formed in spring 2009 to advance the city of Woodstock's green infrastructure master plan known as the Greenprints Project.

Infrastructure

Transportation

Major roads
  Interstate 575
  State Route 92

Pedestrians and cycling
Noonday Creek Trail
Serenade Trail
Trestle Rock Trail

City services
Woodstock maintains its own fire and police departments. As of January 2018, the fire department had two fire stations and 44 certified fire fighters. The fire department is commanded by Dave Soumas. The police department is composed of four divisions with 54 sworn officers. Calvin Moss is the Chief of Police.

Notable people
Buff Bagwell, professional wrestler, five-time WCW World Tag Team champion
Eugene T. Booth, Rhodes Scholar who constructed the Columbia University cyclotron and worked on the Manhattan Project
Lew Carpenter, former MLB baseball player (Washington Senators)
Kent Emanuel, MLB baseball player (Philadelphia Phillies)
Elijah Hirsh, American-Israeli basketball player (Israeli Basketball Premier League)
Mary Hood, author
Johnny Hunt, president of the Southern Baptist Convention (2008–2010)
Harold S. Johnston, chemist and National Medal of Science laureate
Chris Kirk, PGA Tour golfer
Bryce Leatherwood, winner of season 22 of The Voice
Nick Markakis, former MLB baseball player (Baltimore Orioles and Atlanta Braves)
Bruce Miller, NFL football player (Free agent)
Melanie Newman, MLB baseball announcer (Baltimore Orioles)
Bronson Rechsteiner, professional WWE wrestler and former football player (Baltimore Ravens)
Chandler Riggs, actor
Dean Rusk, United States Secretary of State (1961–1969)
Buster Skrine, NFL football player (Tennessee Titans)
SoFaygo, rapper
Tyler Speer, professional racer
Drew Waters, MLB baseball player (Kansas City Royals)
Mark Wills, country music artist
William Diehl, author of thriller novels

References

External links
City of Woodstock official website

Cities in Georgia (U.S. state)
Cities in Cherokee County, Georgia
1897 establishments in Georgia (U.S. state)